Sultan Quli Qutb-ul-Mulk, more often though less correctly referred to in English as Quli Qutb Shah (1485–1543), was the founder of the Qutb Shahi dynasty, which ruled the Sultanate of Golconda in southern India from 1518 to 1687. Of Turkmen origin and born in Persia, he originally served the Bahmani sultan, and was awarded the title Qutb-ul-Mulk (Pillar of the Realm) as military chief; he eventually took control of Golconda.

Background
Originally named Sultan Quli, he was a Shi'i Turkmen from the city of Hamadan in Persia. He was the son of Uways Quli Beg, of the Qara Qoyunlu dynasty, and Maryam Khanum, a daughter of the Hamadan noble Malik Saleh. Through his father, he was descended from the Turkmen ruler Qara Yusuf twice over; his grandparents, Pir Quli Beg and Khadija Begum, were grandchildren of Qara Yusuf's sons Qara Iskander and Jahan Shah respectively.

Sultan Quli had come to South India for the horse trade, and mentioned in SM Kamal's he is belonging to Rowther Horse Traders from Persia. He migrated to Delhi with some of his relatives and friends, including his uncle Allah Quli Beg, in the beginning of the 16th century. Later, he travelled south to Deccan and served the Bahmani sultan. Due to his successful leadership in military conflicts, he received the title "Qutb-ul-Mulk".

Establishing the Qutb Shahi Sultanate

After the disintegration of the Bahmani Sultanate into the five Deccan sultanates, he declared independence and took the title of Qutb Shah, and established the Qutb Shahi dynasty of Golconda. Even though there is ample evidence that he never proclaimed his kingship. The inscription on his grave itself names him as Sultan Quli Qutb-ul-Mulk:

Many historians have misattributed the word 'Sultan' in his name but his whole name just meant 'Servant of the Sultan' just like his Uncle Allah Mulk which meant 'Servant of Allah'.

Extension of the Sultanate
Sultan Quli Qutb Shah was a contemporary of Krishana Deva Raya and his younger brother Achyuta Deva Raya of the Vijayanagara Empire. Sultan Quli extended his rule by capturing forts at Warangal, Kondapalli, Eluru, and Rajamundry, while Krishnadevaraya was fighting the ruler of Odisha. He defeated Sitapati Raju (known as Shitab Khan), the ruler of Khammam, and captured the fort. He forced Jeypore's ruler Vishwanath Dev Gajapati to surrender all the territories between the mouths of Krishna and Godavari rivers. He was able to occupy Eluru, Rajamundry and Machilipatnam extending his rule to Coastal Andhra. Sultan Quli's campaign against Krishnadevaraya continued until Timmarusu, the Prime Minister of Krishnadevaraya, defeated the Golconda army.

Death and succession
In 1543, while he was offering his prayers, Sultan Quli Qutb Shah was assassinated by his second son, Jamsheed Quli Qutb Shah. Jamsheed Quli also blinded Sultan Quli's eldest son and heir, Qutbuddin, and assumed the throne. His sixth son Ibrahim Quli Qutub Shah fled to Vijayanagara. Jamsheed Quli also killed his brother (the third son of Sultan Quli), Abdul Quadeer, who had revolted after their father's death.

Notes

References

16th-century Indian monarchs
1543 deaths
Qutb Shahi dynasty
Hyderabad State
People from Hamadan Province
1470 births
Ethnic Turkmen people